Nepali is a 2008 Indian Tamil-language neo-noir thriller film written and directed by V. Z. Durai and produced by Rama Saravanan. It stars Bharath and Meera Jasmine, while Govind Namdeo and Prem play supporting roles and Sangeetha in a guest appearance. The film marks Namdeo's Tamil debut. Bharath plays three different characters within one role in the movie. The film has music by Srikanth Deva, cinematography by Madhi and editing by Mathan Gunadeva. The film was shot in Ooty, Chennai and Hyderabad. It released on 10 April 2008.

Plot
Nepali (Bharath) works in a supermarket. He kills a few people suddenly and leaves a clue along with the dead bodies. Gautham (Prem) is the Deputy Commissioner of Police, and he takes charge of the case. He tries to analyze the clues left behind by the murderer to find some solution to the case. Karthik (also Bharath) is a software engineer who leads a joyful life enjoying himself with his friends. One day, Karthik meets Priya (Meera Jasmine) in a showroom and immediately develops an attraction towards her. Priya also likes Karthik’s charming character, and they both fall in love. Meanwhile, there is a depressed convict (also Bharath) who has been jailed for some crime. The convict often tries to end his life by committing suicide but is saved by the jailer, and the police beats him for his activities.

Gautham cracks the clue left over by Nepali and guesses his next move of murdering a person. Gautham gets close to the murderer, but he escapes after murdering his target. Karthik and Priya decide to get married, although Priya’s parents are not interested in this alliance. Nevertheless, both get married and lead a life together. Suddenly Priya’s parents register a complaint against Karthik, accusing him of kidnapping their daughter. Corrupt Assistant Commissioner of Police Ashok (Raja Ravindra) comes to inquire about the case and understands that Karthik and Priya are true lovers.

Ashok gets attracted towards Priya and decides to have an illicit affair with her. Priya understands his motive and decides to stay away from him. Priya informs this to Karthik, which angers him, and goes to meet Ashok. When Karthik is away, Ashok comes to Priya’s home and tries to rape her. To save herself, Priya ends her life. Karthik gets furious seeing this, and he kills Ashok, for which he gets jailed.

Although the movie shows three parallel stories, now it is revealed to the audience that all three characters are the same person. The depressed convict is none other than Karthik. He decides to end his life many times in jail as he does not want to lead a life without his wife Priya but gets saved by the jailer and other policemen. In jail, Karthik meets a Nepali (Govind Namdeo), who has been arrested for voicing out against female harassment. The jailer, along with a few other policemen, kill the Nepali as per some big shot’s order, and they divert the case by mentioning that the Nepali had committed suicide .

Karthik now decides to get into the identity of Nepali and continue his activities. He escapes from jail, changes his looks to resemble a Nepali, and starts to kill people who molest girls. Gautham finds out that a Nepali is responsible for all the murders and warns him to surrender, for which he refuses. Karthik is on the way to kill his next target, during which he gets spotted by Gautham. A chase occurs between them, followed by a fight between Karthik and Gautham in an underground parking area.

Suddenly a gunshot is heard, after which Karthik runs out from the parking. But he is shocked to see the images of Priya and the Nepali in front of him. Karthik is confused and turns back to where he sees Gautham coming alive, along with Karthik's dead body. It is revealed that Gautham shot Karthik (the gunshot heard was from Gautham) and Karthik’s soul has ran out. It meets the souls of Priya and the Nepali and reunites with them in the heaven.

Cast

Bharath as Karthik alias Bharathan (Nepali)
Meera Jasmine as Priya (Voice dubbed by Savitha Reddy)
Govind Namdeo as Nepali
Prem as DCP Gautham IPS (Voice dubbed by K. P. Sekar)
Sangeetha as a program's host (Guest appearance)
Raja Ravindra as ACP Ashok IPS (Voice dubbed by K. P. Sekar)
Meera Krishnan as Priya's mother
Boys Rajan as Priya's father
Ganeshkar as Moorthi
Mayilsamy as Priya's relative
Munnar Ramesh as Police officer
Aryan as a corrupt doctor (Guest appearance)

Production
The project was first announced in May 2007 titled Hindu Nesan, with reports stating that Durai would direct Jiiva in the film, with Ameer financing the project. In September 2007, the project was retitled as Nepali but soon afterwards Bharath replaced Jiiva in the lead role. The film was produced by Rama Saravanan who earlier produced the Shaam starrer ABCD.

Release
The satellite rights of the film were secured by Sun TV. This film was given an "UA" certificate by the Indian Censor Board.

Soundtrack

The soundtrack features 5 songs composed by Srikanth Deva.

Critical reception
Sify wrote: "Dorai has been successful in confusing the viewer with three parallel episodes which gets a bit annoying after a while before he reaches the conclusion in the climax. The major fault with Nepali is that it is one of those movies that should never have been made, as it is a stale old vigilante story with an overdose of violence, blood and gore". Behindwoods wrote:"Overall, Nepali is a product that started off with a good idea but slipped down because of a script that failed to maintain flow and execution that took the zing out of the plot". Nowrunning wrote:"Though the story may sound familiar, there is a novelty in the style of its narration. Bharath's modus operandi is also uncommon. The character development is brilliant".

References

2008 films
Films shot in Ooty
2000s Tamil-language films
Indian vigilante films
Indian action thriller films
Films scored by Srikanth Deva
Indian neo-noir films
Indian films about revenge
Indian serial killer films
Films about harassment
Indian prison films
Films directed by V. Z. Durai
2008 action thriller films
2000s prison films
2000s serial killer films